Jeonju Airport  is a small military airport located near Jeonju (Chonju), South Korea. Before, it used to serve civilian transport aircraft.

References

External links
 

Airports in South Korea